The 1990 UK Championship (also known as the 1990 StormSeal UK Championship for sponsorship reasons) was a professional ranking snooker tournament that took place between 16 November and 2 December 1990 at the Guild Hall in Preston, England. This was the second and last UK Championship to be sponsored by StormSeal. The televised stages were shown on the BBC from 24 November to the final.

Hendry beat 19-year-old fellow Scot Alan McManus in the semi-final by a 9–5 scoreline. McManus, who was in his rookie season, had just beaten Dennis Taylor, Steve Newbury, Silvino Francisco and Jimmy White to make the semis. Nigel Bond, who was a finalist at the Grand Prix a month earlier, made it to the quarter-finals losing to Davis.

Defending champion Stephen Hendry defeated Steve Davis 16–15 in the final. The highest break of the tournament was 140 made by John Parrott.

Prize fund
The breakdown of prize money for this year is shown below:
Winner:   £110,000
Runner-up: £n/a
Semi-finals: £30,000
Total:   £445,000

Main draw

Final

Century breaks

 140, 119, 102  John Parrott
 139, 104  Ian Graham
 138  James Wattana
 130, 122, 109, 108, 106, 101, 100  Stephen Hendry
 130  Tony Knowles
 130  Willie Thorne
 126,  Gary Wilkinson
 124, 107  Nigel Bond
 123, 104, 102  Steve Davis
 122  Alain Robidoux

 120  Steve James
 115, 109, 105  Jonathan Birch
 110, 101  Alan McManus
 110  Mick Price
 109  Mark Rowing
 108  Gary Natale
 105  Joe Grech
 102  Martin Clark
 101  Doug Mountjoy
 100  Danny Fowler

References

UK Championship (snooker)
UK Championship
UK Championship
UK Championship
UK Championship